Clear Creek is a stream in northeast Atlanta that is a tributary to Peachtree Creek and part of the Chattahoochee River watershed.  It has two main branches, one originating east of the high ground along which Boulevard runs and another to the west originating on the northeast side of downtown Atlanta. The easterly branch of Clear Creek begins in several springs and branches in what are now Inman Park and the Old Fourth Ward. Flowing north, the creek was joined by other branches and springs, including Angier Springs near the end of Belgrade Avenue and the so-called Ponce de Leon Springs, which were “discovered” during railroad construction in the 1860s and gave rise to the eponymous park and avenue.

The western branch of Clear Creek began in the northeast quadrant of downtown between Decatur and Peachtree Streets and flowed through the lowlands east of Piedmont Avenue where the Atlanta Civic Center was built in the mid-1960s. In the fall of 1864 the Union Army camped along the creek, and for several decades that prong of Clear Creek was  known as Shermantown Branch. Flowing in a northeasterly meander through the eastern side of the Midtown neighborhood, it joined the eastern prong of the creek in the vicinity of the present Midtown High School stadium.

From there the creek flowed in a northerly direction and is joined by several smaller tributaries, including one which originated in at least two springs, one in the vicinity of the Federal Reserve and another northeast of the intersection of Eighth and Juniper Streets. Their water combined to form a branch that was large enough to be dammed in 1894 to create Piedmont Park's Clara Meer. Today there are six springs in the restored wetlands below the dam. A somewhat larger branch drains Orme Park and a large part of the northwest side of Virginia-Highland as well as the southwest side of Morningside. Sometimes known as Stillhouse Branch in the nineteenth century, it joins Clear Creek a few hundred feet west of the dead end of Dutch Valley Road. A smaller branch drains most of Ansley Park, emptying into Clear Creek in the Ansley Golf Club's course east of Montgomery Ferry Road, and yet another branch out of Sherwood Forest flows into Clear Creek just east of the Interstate 85 bridge.

In the mid-nineteenth century, a grist mill was located just downstream from where the Beltline crosses the creek at the northern end of Piedmont Park. As Jones Mill, it was a landmark in maps from the Civil War, but it is often known as Walkers Mill, for a later owner.

For decades in the late nineteenth and early twentieth centuries, the creek was used as a sewer and polluted by industrial waste. The western branch was completely buried by the 1930s and much of the eastern branch by 1950. North of Tenth Street, the creek was turned into a large concrete channel through Piedmont Park and through the Ansley golf course.

Recent efforts to improve water quality, habitat, access and opportunities for nature appreciation

Clear Creek Basin at Historic Fourth Ward Park (2011) 
Historic Fourth Ward Park comprises 17 acres of headwaters greenspace and is built on the site of the old Ponce de Leon amusement park, just south of Ponce City Market and just west of the BeltLine trail. Intended to provide stormwater management for an area undergoing intensive redevelopment, it was one of the first completed urban park elements of the Atlanta BeltLine project.

Construction includes a two-acre detention pond providing relief to the City of Atlanta's combined sewer system, a 24” tap into the existing 9’ x 9’ Clear Creek trunk sewer, the installation of nearly 1,000 LF 6’ x 3’ box culvert, re-routing and reconstructing city streets, elevated walkways, extensive walls, ramps, various hardscapes, decorative railings, site lighting, wetlands plantings and landscaping. The pond generates a minimum of 425 gallons a minute from the submerged Clear Creek water table available for maintaining the park's lawns and playing fields. Additional water features include a ten-foot waterfall to aerate and recycle the pond water and a stone water cascade that runs alongside one of the park's walkways.

Stream and wetland rehabilitation at Piedmont Park (2011) 
Recent parkland expansion and multimillion-dollar green infrastructure developments (2011, 2013) managed through the Piedmont Park Conservancy are designed to improve Clear Creek's water quality and enhance biodiversity. Educational signage along the waterway offers information about the importance of healthy watershed systems.

Clear Creek CSO Treatment Facility at 1320 Monroe Drive (1996) 
Comprising approximately 3,086 acres and having a maximum overflow capacity of approximately 5,060 million gallons per day (mgd), the Clear Creek CSO Facility serves the largest combined sewershed of the city's seven CSO facilities, and includes the Downtown Business District and Midtown Atlanta. Dry weather flow (less than 40 mgd is routed to the Peachtree interceptor), which then takes the flow to the R.M. Clayton WRC for treatment. Wet weather flow is routed to the Clear Creek CSO facility for treatment before being discharged to an open channel that leads to Clear Creek. Existing treatment consists of coarse screening, fine screening, and disinfection by sodium hypochlorite.

Clear Creek Nature Preserve & City of Atlanta Greenway Acquisition Project (1998 - 2007) 
The City of Atlanta Greenway Acquisition Project was a $25 million program to acquire and protect properties adjacent to selected rivers and creeks within the Metro Atlanta area. Once acquired, these greenway properties are to be forever maintained in a natural, undisturbed state. Clear Creek Nature Preserve of Brookwood Hills Community Club comprises 70 acres of privately held riparian bottomland protected by conservation easement through the Greenway Acquisition Project. Conservation of greenway properties protects water quality in rivers and streams and also protects animal habitats, plant habitats, and wetlands. Land adjacent to the waterways is to be protected from erosion, flood damage, and clear-cutting.

New urbanism style planning and redevelopment within the Clear Creek watershed and BeltLine corridor

Greater Piedmont Heights Master Framework Plan (2012) 
Objectives:

1. Unify the many plans by others in and around Piedmont Heights into a single implementable Master Framework Plan leveraging community assets, respecting the interests of all persons and following the Hannover Principles.*

2. Modify Buford Highway, Monroe Drive and Piedmont Road for more appropriate interface with abutting neighborhoods and to divert through traffic away from residential areas.

3. Transform the open space under I-85 and along the Peachtree Creek waterway into cultural and environmental assets.

4. Alter internal streets and intersections for safety and walkability, to minimize vehicle/pedestrian conflicts and to encourage appropriate new development.

5. Create a plan for additional green space and a pedestrian network connecting the neighborhood to the BeltLine, nearby trails, parks, creeks and open spaces.

6. Integrate existing and proposed public transit systems ensuring minimum disruption and optimum access.

Ponce City Market (2014) 
Located where the BeltLine crosses Ponce de Leon Avenue in the Old Fourth Ward; a mixed-use development of the historic Sears, Roebuck & Co. building. The 2,100,000-square-foot structure is one of the largest by volume in the Southeast United States. The building's lot covers 16 acres.

Armour Yards and Sweetwater Design District (2015) 
The SweetWater Design District (2010) located around Armour Circle, Ottley Drive and Plasters Avenue NE, was established to foster a welcoming atmosphere for visitors and to create a stronger community among the businesses and organizations .

Armour Yards (2015), near Sweetwater Brewery and a future BeltLine connection, is a 6.5 acre, mixed-use, west coast style, loft office campus by Third & Urban, a real estate development and investment firm.

References

Chattahoochee River
Geography of Atlanta